Brigadier-General Edward Fitzpatrick (died 10 November 1696) was an English Army officer who became colonel of the Ordnance Regiment.

Military career
Born the son of Andrew Fitzpatrick of Castlefleming and Ellice (daughter of Richard Butler, 3rd Viscount Mountgarret), Fitzpatrick was given command of a regiment under King William III and saw action during the Williamite War in Ireland. He became colonel of the Ordnance Regiment on 1 August 1692. Promoted to brigadier-general on 24 October 1694, he died when travelling by sea on the Holyhead Packet Ship to Ireland on 10 November 1696.

References

Sources

 

1696 deaths
English generals
Williamite military personnel of the Williamite War in Ireland
Royal Fusiliers officers